Robert D. Krebs is an American railroad executive who has headed three major United States railroads in succession, leading the Southern Pacific (SP) when it was acquired by Santa Fe Industries, rising to lead the resulting Santa Fe Pacific Corporation, and finally being chosen to head the new Burlington Northern Santa Fe (BNSF) when Santa Fe Pacific (the holding company for the Santa Fe railroad) merged with Burlington Northern. 

He started out working for SP subsidiary Cotton Belt in the early 1960s becoming the youngest Superintendent of Cotton Belt's Pine Bluff Division in 1971 at age 29. Krebs eventually become president of the SP and later CEO of ATSF and BNSF. He retired as CEO of BNSF in 2000 and left the board when he retired as chairman on April 17, 2002.

On May 13, 2005, Krebs joined the Board of Directors for Railpower Technologies, a position from which he subsequently resigned on September 9, 2005, citing personal reasons.

References 

 

Year of birth missing (living people)
Living people
20th-century American railroad executives
Atchison, Topeka and Santa Fe Railway presidents
Southern Pacific Railroad people
American railroaders